Henry Arthur Oberholzer (12 April 1893 – 20 March 1953) was a British gymnast who competed in the 1912 Summer Olympics. He was part of the British team, which won the bronze medal in the gymnastics men's team, European system event in 1912.

References

External links
Henry Oberholzer's profile at databaseOlympics

1893 births
1953 deaths
British male artistic gymnasts
Gymnasts at the 1912 Summer Olympics
Olympic gymnasts of Great Britain
Olympic bronze medallists for Great Britain
Olympic medalists in gymnastics
Medalists at the 1912 Summer Olympics